The Cincinnati Bearcats football statistical leaders are individual statistical leaders of the Cincinnati Bearcats football program in various categories, including passing, rushing, receiving, total offense, all-purpose yardage, defensive stats, and kicking. Within those areas, the lists identify single-game, single-season, and career leaders. As of the upcoming 2023 season, the Bearcats represent the University of Cincinnati in the NCAA Division I FBS Big 12 Conference.

Although Cincinnati began competing in intercollegiate football in 1885, the school's official record book considers the "modern era" to have begun in 1950s. Records from before this year are often incomplete and inconsistent, and they are generally not included in these lists.

These lists are dominated by more recent players for several reasons:
 Since 1950s, seasons have increased from 10 games to 11 and then 12 games in length.
 The NCAA didn't allow freshmen to play varsity football until 1972 (with the exception of the World War II years), allowing players to have four-year careers.
 Bowl games only began counting toward single-season and career statistics in 2002. The Bearcats have played in 14 bowl games since then, giving many recent players an extra game to accumulate statistics.
 The American Athletic Conference, in which Cincinnati played from 2013 to 2022, has held a championship game since 2015. The Bearcats played in that game three times (2019, 2020, 2021), giving players in those seasons yet another game to accumulate statistics. However, the 2020 team only played 10 regularly scheduled games instead of the normal 12 due to COVID-19 constraints.
 Due to COVID-19 issues, the NCAA ruled that the 2020 season would not count against any football player's athletic eligibility, giving all who played in that season the opportunity for five years of eligibility instead of the normal four.

These lists are updated through the 2022 regular season.

Passing

Passing yards

Passing touchdowns

Rushing

Rushing yards

Rushing touchdowns

Receiving

Receptions

Receiving yards

Receiving touchdowns

Total offense
Total offense is the sum of passing and rushing statistics. It does not include receiving or returns.

Total offense yards

Touchdowns responsible for
"Touchdowns responsible for" is the official NCAA term for combined rushing and passing touchdowns. It does not include receiving or returns.

Cincinnati's 2021 record book only lists this statistic from the 2000 season forward. Past editions of its record book did include seasons before 2000.

All-purpose yardage
All-purpose yardage is the sum of all yards credited to a player who is in possession of the ball. It includes rushing, receiving, and returns, but does not include passing.

While Cincinnati lists a complete top 10 in all-purpose yardage over all relevant time frames (career, season, game), it does not break down its leaders' performances by type of play.

Defense

Interceptions

Tackles

Sacks

Kicking

Field goals made

Field goal percentage

Footnotes

References

Cincinnati